Timur Ruslanovich Naniev (born 20 September 1994) is a Russian weightlifter. He represents Russia at the 2020 Summer Olympics in Tokyo.

References

1994 births
Living people
Russian male weightlifters
Weightlifters at the 2020 Summer Olympics
Sportspeople from Vladikavkaz
Olympic weightlifters of Russia
20th-century Russian people
21st-century Russian people